Paradise Bakery & Café is a Scottsdale, Arizona-based chain of bakery–café quick casual restaurants predominantly located in the western and southwestern United States. It was independently established in 1976; as of 2009, it is wholly owned by Panera Bread. As of early 2012, it operates 60 stores in 9 states.

History
The chain was established in Long Beach, California, in 1976 by Daniel Patterson. At the time it was known as Cookie Muncher's Paradise and exclusively sold cookies, muffins, and lemonade. By 1979, it had expanded to its product portfolio to include sandwiches, soups, salads, and other bakery items.

In February 2007, a majority stake in the chain was purchased by Panera, which later bought out the remainder of the company in 2009. Mark and Daniel Patterson still own and operate one paradise bakery in Aspen, Colorado.

References

External links
 Official website

Bakeries of California
Bakery cafés
Companies based in Phoenix, Arizona
Regional restaurant chains in the United States
Restaurants established in 1976
Fast casual restaurants
Restaurant franchises
2009 mergers and acquisitions
1976 establishments in California
Coffeehouses and cafés in the United States